The 2015 Sunshine Tour was the 16th season of professional golf tournaments since the southern Africa based Sunshine Tour was relaunched in 2000, and the 9th since the tour switched a calendar based season in 2007. The Sunshine Tour represents the highest level of competition for male professional golfers in the region.

The tour is based predominantly in South Africa with other events being held in neighbouring countries, including Zimbabwe, Swaziland, Zambia and Mauritius.

Schedule
The following table lists official events during the 2015 season.

Order of Merit
The Order of Merit was based on prize money won during the season, calculated in South African rand.

Andy Sullivan (2.7 million) did not play the minimum number of tournaments required (seven) to be ranked.

Notes

References

External links

Sunshine Tour
Sunshine Tour